The Volcanic Eifel or Vulkan Eifel is a region in the Eifel Mountains in Germany that is defined to a large extent by its volcanic geological history. Characteristic of this volcanic field are its typical explosion crater lakes or maars, and numerous other signs of volcanic activity such as volcanic tuffs, lava streams and volcanic craters like the Laacher See. The Volcanic Eifel is still volcanically active today. One sign of this activity is the escaping gases in the Laacher See.

Geographical location 

The Volcanic Eifel stretches from the Rhine to the Wittlich Depression. It is bordered in the south and southwest by the South Eifel, in the west by Luxembourg and Belgian Ardennes and in the north by the North Eifel including the Hohes Venn. To the east the Rhine forms its geographical boundary, with no volcanicity immediately beyond it.

The Volcanic Eifel is divided into three natural regions:
 Volcanic West Eifel (Manderscheid, Daun, Gerolstein, Obere Kyll, Hillesheim (within the parish of Nohn),
 Volcanic High Eifel (Adenau, Kelberg, Ulmen and Nohn),
 Volcanic East Eifel (Brohltal, Vordereifel, Mendig, Pellenz)
The centre of the Volcanic Eifel is the region around Daun and Manderscheid and the areas within the Mayen-Koblenz district.

The landscape of the Volcanic Eifel is dominated by recent volcanism. Volcanic craters, thick pumice and basalt layers and maars create a diverse landscape that clearly witnesses to very recent events in geological terms.

Volcanoes 

The following volcanoes belong to the Eifel, sorted by height in metres (m) above sea level (Normalhöhennull, NHN):
 Ernstberg (also: Erresberg), county of Vulkaneifel – west
 Scharteberg, county of Vulkaneifel; with the Eifel Transmitter (SWR) – west
 Prümscheid, county of Vulkaneifel – not volcanic (eponymous quartzite ridge; other summits being the Scharteberg and Dietzenley)
 Hochkelberg, county of Vulkaneifel; with a transmission mast on its south summit – Tertiary
 Nerother Kopf, county of Vulkaneifel; with the castle ruins of the Freudenkoppe – west
 Dietzenley, county of Vulkaneifel; with a wooden observation tower – west
 Hochsimmer, county of Mayen-Koblenz – east
 Gänsehals, county of Mayen-Koblenz – east
 Engelner Kopf, county of Ahrweiler (near Kempenich-Engeln) – east
 Hochstein, county of Mayen-Koblenz – east
 Steineberger Ley, county of Vulkaneifel; with a Volcano Information Platform (observation tower) – Tertiary
 Rockeskyller Kopf, county of Vulkaneifel – west
 Hoher List, county of Vulkaneifel; with the Hoher List Observatory – west
 Veitskopf, county of Ahrweiler; near Laacher See; with an observation tower, the Lydia Tower – east
 Ettringer Bellberg, county of Mayen-Koblenz (south of Ettringen) – east
 Karmelenberg, county of Mayen-Koblenz – east
 Mayener Bellberg, county of Mayen-Koblenz (north of Mayen) – east
 Korretsberg, county of Mayen-Koblenz (near Kruft) – east

Laacher See
Of particular note is the volcanic caldera known as Laacher See, the site of an eruption around 12,900 years ago that had an estimated VEI of 6.

Geopark and museums 
 Vulkanland Eifel National Geopark
 Volcano Museum, Daun
Volcano House, Strohn
German Volcano Museum, Mendig

Future activity
There is thought that future eruptions may occur in the Eifel, as:
Each year the Eifel rises by about a millimetre.
Geophysicists found that crust under the Eifel is thinner than most continental crust, suggesting that under the Eifel is a hot zone where magma is rising.
Persistent small earthquakes and underground heating.
Map of flood lake that may happen if the Rhine is blocked by a voluminous eruption in the Eifel

In 2020, Professor Kreemer noted that Eifel was the only region within an area of Europe studied where ground motion happened at significantly higher levels than expected. It is possible that such movements originate from a rising magma plume. This activity does not imply an immediate eruptive danger, but might suggest an increase in volcanic and seismic activity in the region.

References

Further reading 
 Werner P. D’hein: Vulkanland Eifel. Natur- und Kulturführer, mit 26 Stationen der „Deutschen Vulkanstraße“. Gaasterland Verlag, Düsseldorf 2006, 
 Wilhelm Meyer: Geologie der Eifel. Schweizerbart’sche Verlagsbuchhandlung, Stuttgart 1986.

External links 

 Homepage of Vulkaneifel district
 German Volcanological Society
 
 

Landscapes of Rhineland-Palatinate
Pleistocene volcanism
Holocene volcanism
Volcanism of Germany
Regions of the Eifel
Global Geoparks Network members